Dictyna armata is spider species found in Ukraine and Georgia.

See also 
 List of Dictynidae species

References

External links 

Dictynidae
Spiders of Georgia (country)
Spiders of Europe
Spiders described in 1875